Macbeth Footwear, is a Southern Californian footwear, apparel, and accessories brand. Founded in 2002, It sells many vegan and organic products. One of its founders is Tom DeLonge, a member of Blink 182. 

Since June 2014, Macbeth Footwear has been owned by Saban Brands. Macbeth's main market is Southeast Asia. Most of its footwear and apparel is sold in Indonesia, Malaysia, and the Philippines.  At first, it focused on streetwear, but recently it expanded its products to hoodies and jeans and jakes.

References

External links
www.Macbeth.com
www.macbethph.com
macbeth.com.my

2002 establishments in California
Athletic shoe brands
Blink-182
Clothing brands of the United States
Companies based in Carlsbad, California
Clothing companies established in 2002
Sporting goods manufacturers of the United States